The 1933 Wisconsin Badgers football team was an American football team that represented the University of Wisconsin in the 1933 Big Ten Conference football season. The team compiled a 2–5–1 record (0–5–1 against conference opponents) and finished in last place in the Big Ten Conference. Clarence Spears was in his second year as Wisconsin's head coach.

Halfback Robert Schiller was selected as the team's most valuable player. Harold Smith was the team captain. No Wisconsin players received All-American or All-Big Ten honors in 1933.

The team played its home games at Camp Randall Stadium, which had a capacity of 32,700. During the 1933 season, the average attendance at home games was 13,579.

Schedule

References

Wisconsin
Wisconsin Badgers football seasons
Wisconsin Badgers football